Quiullacocha (possibly from Quechua qillwa, qiwlla, qiwiña gull, qucha lake, "gull lake") is a small lake in Peru located in the Huánuco Region, Huánuco Province, Chinchao District, north of Acomayo.

See also
 Acomayo River
 Wanakawri

References 

Lakes of Peru
Lakes of Huánuco Region